The women's 1500 metres event at the 2008 African Championships in Athletics was held at the Addis Ababa Stadium on May 2.

Results

References
Results (Archived)

2008 African Championships in Athletics
1500 metres at the African Championships in Athletics
2008 in women's athletics